Hans Guttorm (29 June 1927 – 25 September 2013) was a Norwegian politician for the Labour Party.

He served as a deputy representative to the Parliament of Norway from Finnmark during the term 1965–1969, and later served in the Sami Parliament from 1989 to 1993. He was also a member of the Sami Educational Council from 1980 to 1983 and chairman of the Sami Development Fund.

References

1927 births
2013 deaths
Deputy members of the Storting
Labour Party (Norway) politicians
Finnmark politicians
Norwegian Sámi politicians
Norwegian Sámi people